{{DISPLAYTITLE:Tau1 Gruis b}}

Tau1 Gruis b, also known as HD 216435 b, is an extrasolar planet approximately 109 light-years away in the constellation of Grus (the Crane). The planet was discovered orbiting the star  in September 2002. It was calculated that the planet orbits its sun at an average distance of 2.7 astronomical units. The planet is over 1.25 times as massive as Jupiter.

See also 
 55 Cancri
 Phi2 Pavonis
 Rho Indi b

References 
  (web Preprint)

External links 
 
 

Grus (constellation)
Exoplanets discovered in 2002
Giant planets
Exoplanets detected by radial velocity